Uda is a commune in Argeș County, Muntenia, Romania. It is composed of sixteen villages: Bădulești, Bărănești, Braniștea, Chirițești, Cotu, Dealu Bisericii, Dealu Tolcesii, Diconești, Gorani, Greabăn, Lungulești, Miercani, Râjlețu-Govora, Romana, Săliștea and Uda.

References

Communes in Argeș County
Localities in Muntenia